Hygrotus parallelogrammus is a species of Dytiscidae native to Europe.

References

Hygrotus
Beetles described in 1812
Beetles of Europe